Phaonia lugubris is a species of fly which is distribution across parts the Palaearctic.

References

Muscidae
Diptera of Europe
Insects described in 1826
Taxa named by Johann Wilhelm Meigen